Cédric Vernier (born January 13, 1975 in Saint-Rémy) is a French professional football player. Currently, he plays in the Championnat de France amateur for ÉDS Montluçon.

He played on the professional level in Ligue 2 for CS Louhans-Cuiseaux.

1975 births
Living people
French footballers
Ligue 2 players
Louhans-Cuiseaux FC players
Paris FC players
Grenoble Foot 38 players
Dijon FCO players
Montluçon Football players
Association football defenders